Alistair "Ali" Davys (born 1 July 1970) is a former rugby league footballer who played as a . He played for Gold Coast Seagulls in the NSWRL and English clubs Salford City Reds and Huddersfield Giants.

At international level, he represented Cook Islands, helping the team win the 1995 Rugby League Emerging Nations Tournament.

References

External links
Rugby League Project profile

1970 births
Living people
Australian rugby league players
Australian expatriate sportspeople in England
Cook Islands national rugby league team players
Gold Coast Chargers players
Huddersfield Giants players
Rugby league halfbacks
Salford Red Devils players